Caloreas is a genus of moths in the family Choreutidae.

Species
Caloreas apocynoglossa (Heppner, 1976)
Caloreas augustella (Clarke, 1933)
Caloreas blandinalis (Zeller, 1877)
Caloreas caliginosa (Braun, 1921)
Caloreas charmonica (Walsingham, 1914)
Caloreas coloradella (Dyar, 1900)
Caloreas cydrota (Meyrick, 1915)
Caloreas enantia (Walsingham, 1914)
Caloreas hymenaea (Meyrick, 1909)
Caloreas lactibasis (Walsingham, 1914)
Caloreas leucobasis (Dyar, 1900)
Caloreas loxotenes (Walsingham, 1914)
Caloreas multimarginata (Braun, 1925)
Caloreas occidentella (Dyar, 1900)
Caloreas pelinobasis (Walsingham, 1914)
Caloreas schausiella (Busck, 1907)
Caloreas tacubayella (Kearfott, 1908)
Caloreas venusta (Walsingham, 1914)

External links
choreutidae.lifedesks.org

Choreutidae